The 12040 / 12039 New Delhi–Kathgodam Shatabdi Express is an Indian train of the Shatabdi Express category belonging to Northern Railway zone that runs between  and , the nearest rail-head to many tourist destinations in Uttarakhand like Nainital, Ranikhet etc.

It currently operates as train number 12040 from New Delhi to Kathgodam and as train number 12039 in the reverse direction, serving the states of Delhi, Uttar Pradesh & Uttarakhand.

Inception of the service
As the need of a fast, air conditioned train to Haldwani, Lalkuan and Kathgodam was raised by several political leaders and citizens, Northern Railways decided to run an "AC Superfast" special service on temporary basis in late 2011. The train used to run on Wednesdays, Fridays and Sundays from both ends and on a time-table similar to today's Shatabdi Express. On receiving a satisfactory response, the 12039/40 Shatabdi Express was introduced on the same slot on other four days. The first run was made on 17 March 2012. Later by May 2012, the frequency of the Shatabdi Express was increased to six days a week and the AC Special was done away with.

Coaches

The train presently has one Executive Chair, ten AC Chair Cars & two End on Generator coaches. It does not carry a pantry car but being a Shatabdi category train, catering is arranged on board the train cost of which is included in the ticket fare.
The train started off with eight AC chair car coaches, but owing to the demand, the composition was amended in July 2015.

The coach composition is as follows:

12039: LOCO-
12040: LOCO-

Here 'LOCO' denotes the direction of the locomotive. The rake was non-self-generating ICF type and the maximum permissible speed of the rolling stock is 130 kmph though due to sectional speed restrictions, the train only touches a speed of 110 kmph at max. Later on 28 August 2015 this train was upgrade from ICF to LHB rake.

Service

The Kathgodam-bound train covers the distance of 282 kilometres in 05 hours 30 mins (49 km/hr) while in the return direction it takes in 05 hours 15 mins (51 km/hr). The service was initially slower but speeded up by 5 minutes and 20 minutes respectively in the time-table revision of 2014.

The train is the slowest member of the Shatabdi category of trains owing to the steep gradients in the Lalkuan-Kathgodam section, and single-line operation post Rampur Junction.

Journey
The schedule of this 12039/12040 New Delhi - Kathgodam Shatabdi Express is given below:-

Being a Shatabdi class train, it returns to its originating station New Delhi at the end of the day.

Loco link

As the route is fully electrified,  Ghaziabad-based WAP-5 / WAP-7(HOG Equipped) locomotive powers the train for its entire journey.

Gallery

Change in terminal 
With effect from 11 December 2015, the Kathgodam-bound Shatabdi has been operating from the New Delhi railway station. Accordingly, the departure time of 12040 has been changed to 06:00 hrs instead of 06:20hrs. The revised arrival time of 12039 at New Delhi railway station is 20:50. The change in terminal will hugely benefit tourists as the New Delhi railway station is connected to the Airport Express (Orange Line) of Delhi Metro and is also closer to the Main Bazar in Paharganj, a popular destination for tourists.

References

External links

Shatabdi Express trains
Rail transport in Delhi
Rail transport in Uttar Pradesh
Rail transport in Uttarakhand
Transport in Delhi
Transport in Haldwani-Kathgodam